Tony Wrighton is a television and radio broadcaster in the United Kingdom who has authored several books and audiobooks on a variety of wellness/personal development topics.

Broadcasting career
Wrighton has presented on Longwave radio station, Atlantic 252, 105.4 Century FM in the North West, and Radio Aire in Leeds during the early 2000’s.

In December 2006, he made his debut as a presenter on Sky Sports News.

Publishing career
Tony has authored 19 books and audiobooks, in addition to producing a personal development app, The Gold Collection. and in 2010 he entered into a three-book deal with Virgin Books, part of Ebury Publishing. He also publishes on blogs and websites, including The Huffington Post.

Tony's podcast Zestology has featured some of the biggest names in health, medicine, science and wellness worldwide like Joe Wicks, Esther Perel and Dave Asprey.

Books

References

External links
Tony Wrighton's website
Zestology website
Tony Wrighton Profile Century FM

Living people
1975 births
English radio presenters
English sports broadcasters
English television presenters